John de Derby was Archdeacon of Barnstaple from 1355 to 1358.

References

Archdeacons of Barnstaple